The Park Avenue Synagogue (Agudat Yesharim, The Association of the Righteous) is a Conservative Jewish congregation located at 50 East 87th Street on the Upper East Side of Manhattan, New York City. Founded in 1882, the congregation is one of the largest and most influential synagogues in the United States.

The congregation was founded in 1882 as the Reform congregation, "Temple Gates of Hope", by a group of German Jews.  After several mergers, the congregation took the Hebrew name "Agudat Yesharim", and later petitioned the state of New York to change the official name of the congregation to "Park Avenue Synagogue" in 1923. In 1927, the present Moorish-style building on East 87th Street was constructed. By the 1930s, the congregation changed its affiliation from Reform Judaism to Conservative in order to accommodate the merger of the congregation with several other congregations containing large numbers of Eastern European Jews.

As of July 2008, the synagogue was led by Senior Rabbi Elliot J. Cosgrove, PhD. As of 2009, Cantor Azi Schwartz joined as Senior Cantor. As of July 2013, Rabbi Neil Zuckerman and Rabbi Ethan Witkovsky joined the team.  The congregation has been led by such famous rabbis as Milton Steinberg and Judah Nadich.

Notable members

References

External links

Cantor Azi Schwartz

Moorish Revival synagogues
Synagogues in Manhattan
Moorish Revival architecture in New York City
Conservative synagogues in New York City
Upper East Side
1882 establishments in New York (state)
German-Jewish culture in New York City